The Central District of Faridan County is the only district (bakhsh) in Faridan County, Isfahan Province, Iran. At the 2006 census, its population was 54,036, in 13,549 families.  The District has two cities: Daran and Damaneh. The District has four rural districts (dehestan): Dalankuh Rural District, Varzaq Rural District, Varzaq-e Jonubi Rural District, and Zayandeh Rud-e Shomali Rural District.

References 

Faridan County
Districts of Isfahan Province